Commodore Mine may refer to :

 Commodore Mine: Thermal black coal mine in Queensland, Australia
 Commodore Mine: Silver, lead, and zinc (primary products extracted) mine in Colorado, United States
 Commodore Mine: 2014 book by Alan Mehrer